William John "Jack" Conibere (11 August 1923 – 19 August 1982) played in four first-class cricket matches for Somerset in the 1950 season. He also played rugby union for the Somerset county side. He was born at Wiveliscombe, Somerset and died at Torquay, Devon.

As a cricketer, Conibere played as an amateur, and was a left-arm fast-medium bowler and a lower-order right-handed batsman. He was given a trial for Somerset in four consecutive County Championship matches in mid-season in 1950, but achieved real success in only the first of them, the game against Warwickshire at Edgbaston, when he took four wickets for 66 runs in Warwickshire's first innings and, with Bertie Buse and Maurice Tremlett, had half the side out for 47 before a recovery led by Tom Dollery. He took two further wickets in Warwickshire's second innings, but in his three further matches he took only one more wicket, and after two weeks his first-class cricket career was over.

A directory of Somerset's post-Second World War cricketers states that "he was probably a better rugby player, representing his county with typical zeal".

References

1923 births
1982 deaths
English cricketers
Somerset cricketers
People from Wiveliscombe